The Rhagophthalmidae are a family of beetles within the superfamily Elateroidea. Members of this beetle family have bioluminescent organs on the larvae, and sometimes adults, and are closely related to the Phengodidae (glowworm beetles), though historically they have been often treated as a subfamily of Lampyridae, or as related to that family. Some recent evidence suggested that they were the sister group to the Phengodidae, and somewhat distantly related to Lampyridae, whose sister taxon was Cantharidae, but more reliable genome-based phylogenetics placed (Rhagophthalmidae + Phengodidae) as the sister group to the Lampyridae.

Whatever their relationships may be, Rhagophthalmidae are distributed in the Old World, and little is known of their biology. Females are usually wingless and look like larvae, but have an adult beetle's eyes, antennae and legs; in the genus Diplocladon, they resemble larvae even more, with small light organs on all trunk segments. Larvae and females live in soil and litter and are predaceous; males may be attracted to lights at night.

Genera
 Bicladodrilus
 Bicladon
 Dioptoma
 Diplocladon
 Dodecatoma
 Falsophrixothrix
 Mimoochotyra
 Mondodrilus
 Pseudothilmanus
 Reductodrilus
 Rhagophthalmus

References 

Elateroidea
Bioluminescent insects
Beetle families